The Great Gildersleeve is a 1942 American comedy film directed by Gordon Douglas. Based on the popular NBC radio series The Great Gildersleeve created by Leonard L. Levinson, which ran from 1941 to 1950, this is the first of four films in the Gildersleeve series produced and distributed by RKO Radio Pictures. The screenplay was written by Jack Townley and Julien Josephson, and the film stars Harold Peary and Jane Darwell. Other films in the series are Gildersleeve's Bad Day (1943), Gildersleeve on Broadway (1943) and Gildersleeve's Ghost (1944).

Plot summary
Throckmorton P Gildersleeve is amorously pursued by the sister of his rival in town, Judge Horace Hooker. Also, Gildersleeve's niece and nephew concoct a campaign to make him the most popular man in town so the judge won't force the kids to become wards of the court if Gildersleeve doesn't get married and provide the children with a mother.

Cast
 Harold Peary as Throckmorton P. Gildersleeve
 Jane Darwell as Aunt Emma Forrester
 Nancy Gates as Marjorie Forrester
 Charles Arnt as Judge Horace Hooker
 Freddie Mercer as Leroy Forrester
 Thurston Hall as Governor John Stafford
 Lillian Randolph as Birdie Lee Calkins
 Mary Field as Amelia Hooker
 George Carleton as Frank Powers
 George Chandler as Messenger Boy

References

External links
 
 
 
 

1942 films
1942 comedy films
American comedy films
American black-and-white films
Films based on radio series
Films directed by Gordon Douglas
RKO Pictures films
1940s English-language films
1940s American films
The Great Gildersleeve